Kevin J. Kuros is an American state legislator who served in the Massachusetts House of Representatives from 2011 to 2018 as a member of the Republican Party. Kuros represented the 8th Worcester District consisting of the towns of Bellingham Blackstone Millville and Uxbridge.

Committee memberships
 Joint Committee on Economic Development and Emerging Technologies
 Joint Committee on Municipalities and Regional Government
 House Committee on Technology and Intergovernmental Affairs

Personal life
Kuros is married to his wife Linda. They have two children and reside in Uxbridge.

External links
 Commonwealth of Massachusetts profile

References

Living people
Republican Party members of the Massachusetts House of Representatives
People from Uxbridge, Massachusetts
21st-century American politicians
Year of birth missing (living people)